The Orphan of Perdide is a novel of science fiction by French author Stefan Wul published in 1958.

Presentation of the work 
The Orphan of Perdide is the seventh novel by the French writer Stefan Wul to be published by the Fleuve noir in the collection "Anticipation" in 1958. Consisting of three parts divided into sixteen chapters, the novel was written by Stefan Wul in three weeks.<ref>See in this preface Laurent Genefort in Stefan Wul,  Complete Works - 1 ' 'Lefrancq Publishing, coll. "Volumes", 1996 p. 13.</ref>

 Plot summary 
On the dangerous planet Perdide, a father and his four-year-old son, Claude, are trying to escape a swarm of giant hornets. Exhausted, the father managed to send a distress message to his friend Max, but failed to reach him directly, and instructed his son to quickly get into the forest on the hill. Before dying, the father gives his transceiver to Claude and tells him to do what it says. The boy finds himself alone in a strange forest with his only companion the small egg-shaped object.

Aboard the ship The Big Max, the smuggler Max discovers the message from his friend and contact Perdide. Little Claude immediately responds, speaking to his microphone as if it were a person. He then decided to divert its route to Perdide to save the child. His two passengers, Belle and her husband Martin, who have paid a large sum to be taken to the planet Sidoine, protest in vain. Max maintains communication with Claude and instructs him on how to survive in a hostile environment.The Big Max lands on the beautiful planet, Devil-Ball, where Max joins his old friend Silbad. The aging Silbad has had a metal plate on his head since he was attacked by hornets on Perdide in his childhood, and knows about the dangers of the planet. Touched by the story of Claude, he boards The Big Max and spends most of his time telling stories to the child and to protect the dangers of the forest.

The four passengers take turns at the microphone to occupy the little Claude. Impatient at the side trip, Martin tried to encourage Claude to enter a dangerous cave, and arrive sooner at Sidoine. Silbad surprises and violently beats him, then Max locks Martin in a cabin of his spaceship. Belle is shocked by the attitude of her husband.

When they make a stopover on the planet Gamma 10, Martin takes the opportunity to escape. Max starts to pursue him, but found Martin's dead body, inert in the sand. He is soon surrounded by a bunch of ex-prisoners of Sidoine stranded on the planet and is taken to a troglodyte village. Silbad eventually comes to search for Max, and is also captured. The two men are presented to the Master who intends to feed them to his hungry monster. But Max and Silbad manage to escape, then provide food to the Master and his monster, and promises to bring back help for the prisoners stranded on the planet.

In his approach to the planet Perdide, The Big Max is caught in unexpectedly intense interstellar and interplanetary traffic and are detained by the police. Max and Silbad question the authorities and learn to their amazement that Perdide is a developed planet, urbanized and largely colonized since its "Enhancement", nearly sixty years earlier. Max and Silbad realise that their space journey at 99% of the speed of light created a time lag of a century between them and the planet Perdide. Hearing the news, Silbad has a heart attack.The Big Max lands on the planet Perdide and Max goes in search of a local historian to understand how the tragic story of the little Claude ended, a hundred years earlier. Max then meets the elderly Bader who saved the little Claude an attack of giant hornets and then adopted. The boy, suffering from amnesia, began to be called Sylvain Bader, but everyone knew him as "Silbad". Max then goes back to the hospital to see the old Silbad dying in horrible suffering without knowing the truth. Max then returned with Belle to Devil-Ball to start a new world.

 Main characters 
The characters are presented in alphabetical order:
  'Mr. Bader'  adoptive father Silbad;
  'Belle Bôz'  passenger on the ship 'The Big Max' ', wife of Martin;
  'Martin Bôz' , a passenger on the ship 'The Big Max' ', husband of Belle;
  'Claude' , the last settler of Perdide;
  'Claude'  or  'Claudi' , son of the last settler of Perdide;
 The  'Master' , chief of the rebels, former prisoners of Sidoine;
  'Max' , captain of  'The Big Max' , idealistic interstellar smuggler;
  'Silbad'  or  'Sylvain Bader'  friend of Max, the old guard of the planet Devil-Ball;
  'Vano' , former prisoner exiled to Sidoine;

 Comments 

 Space-time paradox 
In  The Orphan of Perdide  Stefan Wul operates the famous twin paradox statement in 1911 by Paul Langevin on the basis of the theory of relativity of Albert Einstein. In the story, Max and Silbad traveling in space at a speed close to that of light and undergo a form of time dilation that produces a lag of a century at the end of their journey.

 Self-reference 

 Movie Adaptation  The Orphan of Perdide  was made into a film under the title  Time Masters , an animated feature film by René Laloux with drawings of Moebius. René Laloux was already familiar with the work of Stefan Wul, having adapted a feature film titled  Fantastic Planet  in 1973.

While retaining the backdrop of the novel by Stefan Wul, René Laloux proceeded to change, especially at the end of the story, which is probably related to the judgment he wore himself on the novels by Stefan Wul: "in all Wul novels, mostly, it is a great idea to start. The first two thirds are great, well built, with a coherence in playwriting, etc. And the final third is a little shitty. Or he ran out of time, got tired, or started getting lazy."

The main differences between the original novel and its film version are::

 French editions 
 Fleuve noir, coll. Anticipation № 109, 1958 ;
 Fleuve noir, coll. Super-luxe - Les lendemains retrouvés № 51, 1978 , reissued in 1982  ;
 L'Orphelin de Perdide ou les maîtres du temps, Denoël, coll. Présence du futur № 536, cover by Jean-Yves Kervévan, 1993  ;
 dans Œuvres complètes 1, Lefrancq, coll. Volumes, 1996  ;

 Castelmore, coll. Science-fiction, 2015 . 

 Translations 

 In Portuguese 

 O vagabundo des estrelas, Livro do Brasil, coll. « Argonauta » no 60, 1960.

 In Hungarian 

 A Perdide árvája, Cser Kiadó, 2019. © Hungarian translation: Zoltán Szalóki

 See also 

 Richard Chomet, Satellite, dans la revue Les cahiers de la science-fiction, № 4, 1958 ;
 Ronny L. Idels, Horizons du fantastique № 5, 1969.
 Denis Philippe, OPTA, dans la revue Fiction № 229, 1973 ;
 Amhan, coll. Planète à vendre'', № 17/42, 1993.

References

External links 
 .

1956 French novels
Fiction about planetary systems
1956 science fiction novels
Forests in fiction
French science fiction novels
Science fiction novels adapted into films
French novels adapted into films